Pay It Forward is a novel by Catherine Ryan Hyde, released in 1999 which was adapted into the motion picture Pay It Forward which released theatrically and to DVD in 2000–2001. A second young adult version of the novel was released in 2014.

Plot summary 
When twelve-year-old Trevor McKinney begins seventh grade in Atascadero, California, his social studies teacher, Reuben St Clair, gives the class an assignment to devise and put into action a plan that will change the world for the better. Trevor's plan is a charitable program based on the networking of good deeds. He calls his plan "Pay It Forward", which means the recipient of a favor does a favor for three others. However, it needs to be a major favor that the receiver cannot complete themselves. Trevor first begins by helping Jerry, a jobless man who was unable to find a home. However, he seemingly forgets to complete three favors and ends up in prison. Next, Trevor directly helps his social studies teacher, Mr. Reuben St. Clair. Finally, he helps Mrs. Greenberg, who eventually dies. But without Trevor's knowledge, Mrs. Greenberg had helped three friends by giving them $8,333 in her will. One of them, Matt, meets an injured gangster in an alleyway, named Sidney G. Matt told him about Pay It Forward but told him not to do it. After helping the man, it turns out that gangster helped another man, who also spared the life of his lifetime rival as his favor. Trevor dies by getting stabbed.

Seeing the chain, Chris Chandler, a reporter, connects the dots and finds Trevor. Even further, Trevor's mother, whose father had left, strikes a relationship with Mr. St. Clair, Trevor's Social Studies teacher, and Jerry is heard from again, helping a lady not to commit suicide. The novel details how Trevor's "Pay It Forward" attempts are successful or not successful and how some of the "Pay It Forward" chains result happenings such as Trevor meeting the President, and Trevor's  untimely death, which was made by one last person to help in his Pay It Forward 'project' which soon turned into "The Movement".

Since then, the novel has been translated into twenty languages for publication in more than thirty countries and was chosen among the Best Books for Young Adults in 2001 by the American Library Association.

Differences from the film 

The primary differences are setting and character-related. Instead of the mother being a down-and-out recovering alcoholic in Las Vegas, Nevada, the original story was based in Atascadero, California, a city not far from where Catherine Ryan Hyde resides.

The teacher's burns, instead of being inflicted as a heinous crime by his father, are the result of napalm wounds suffered during service presumably during the Vietnam War. Trevor's discovery comes from a different source (dropping crime rates in one of the state prisons) and that Trevor's story draws enough fame that he gets to meet the President of the United States before his untimely demise in the Washington, DC area. The conclusion of the book draws from Arlene McKinney and Mr. St. Clair's continuing relationship and an act of their own Paying it Forward.

Several of the characters from the book are melded into completely different characters in the movie.  The only true similarity is Jerry, who is much better developed in the book.

Finally, the character Eugene Simonet (whose original name was Reuben St. Clair) was African-American in the novel; however, in the film, he was portrayed by Kevin Spacey.

In the book, Trevor goes to the president for his project. However, in the movie he does not.

References

1999 American novels
American novels adapted into films
Atascadero, California
Novels set in California